Michael O'Gara (died 1748) was an Irish clergyman who served as the Roman Catholic Archbishop of Tuam from 1740 to 1748.

Biography
He was appointed archbishop of the metropolitan see of Tuam by papal brief on 19 September 1740, and received faculties as bishop later in the same month. He received dispensation to exercise all the archiepiscopal acts without the Pallium on 28 November 1741.

He died in office in 1748.

See also
Bernard O'Gara - Brother, Archbishop of Tuam from 1723 to 1740

References

1748 deaths
Roman Catholic archbishops of Tuam
18th-century Roman Catholic archbishops in Ireland
Year of birth unknown